Sajid Afridi (born 8 April 1969) is a Pakistani former first-class cricketer. He is now an umpire and has stood in matches in the 2015–16 Quaid-e-Azam Trophy.

References

External links
 

1969 births
Living people
Pakistani cricketers
Pakistani cricket umpires
Peshawar cricketers
People from Charsadda District, Pakistan
Pashtun people